Sargun Kaur Luthra is an Indian television and film actress. She has portrayed the character of Niyati Khanna in Tantra and presently stars as Dr. Preesha Khurana/  Dr. Nayantara Iyer in Yeh Hai Chahatein.

Early life
Luthra was born on 24 November 1998 in New Delhi, India. She did her schooling at Guru Harkrishan Public School, New Delhi. She took up psychology in college but decided to pursue acting instead, choosing to drop out in the first year. She moved from Delhi to Mumbai in 2017 and stays with her father there. She has a twin brother, Harman Luthra.

Career
After quitting her studies for acting, she made her television debut in 2017 with Star Bharat's thriller Kaal Bhairav Rahasya as Gauri. Luthra also featured in TV commercials, modeling assignments, photoshoots and advertisements.

In 2018, she was seen in a cameo in Star Bharat's fantasy drama Mayavi Maling. Later from 2018 to 2019, she played Niyati Khanna in Colors TV's horror drama series, Tantra.

In 2019, she got the role of Aayat Ganai in the drama Kasganj and since December 2019, Luthra has been portraying Preesha Srinivasan Khurana in Star Plus's Yeh Hai Chahatein opposite Abrar Qazi.

In 2020, she played Priya, Naga Shaurya's character's sister, in Aswathama, thus making her film debut.

Filmography

Television

Films

Music videos

Web series

References

External links 
 
 

Living people
1993 births
Actresses from Delhi
Indian film actresses
Indian television actresses
Indian web series actresses
Actresses in Hindi television
Actresses in Telugu cinema
Female models from Delhi
21st-century Indian actresses